Horacio Pacheco (born 5 May 1983) is a Bolivian football manager.

Career
Pacheco was born in Tarija. After beginning his career as a fitness coach, he began his managerial career in 2014, with Universitario de Tarija. He took the club to the semifinals of the Copa Simón Bolívar in the 2015–16 campaign, and was subsequently appointed in charge of Ciclón in July 2016.

Pacheco resigned from Ciclón on 24 February 2017, and took over Avilés Industrial for the 2018 campaign. With the latter club he reached the finals of the Simón Bolívar, but lost it to Always Ready, and subsequently missed out promotion after losing the play-offs to Destroyers.

In February 2019, Pacheco was named in charge of Real Tomayapo, and won the second division with the club in 2020. On 6 January 2021, he renewed his contract for a further year for the club's debut in the Primera División.

Honours
Real Tomayapo
Copa Simón Bolívar: 2020

References

External links

1983 births
Living people
People from Tarija
Bolivian football managers
Bolivian Primera División managers
C.D. Real Tomayapo managers